Zingel zingel, the zingel, is a species of freshwater ray-finned fish in the family Percidae. It is found in fast-flowing streams in southeastern Europe. It is the type species of the genus Zingel.

Description
Zinger zingel has two separate dorsal fins with 13–15 spines in the first and 18–20 soft rays in the second. No scales occur on the cheeks.

Distribution
Zingel zingel is endemic to the drainage basins of the Danube and Dniestr in south-eastern Europe. They have been recorded from Austria, Bosnia and Herzegovina, Bulgaria, Croatia, Czechia, Germany, Hungary, Moldova, Montenegro, North Macedonia, Poland, Romania, Serbia, Slovakia, Slovenia, and Ukraine.

Habitat and biology
Zingel zingel  adults are found in fast-flowing waters in the main course of large rivers. They spawn over sandy bottoms during March and April. Each female mates with several males in dense spawning aggregations. Each female lays about 5,000 adhesive eggs that attach to gravel. Their prey is made up of aquatic insects, crustaceans, fish eggs, and smaller fish. They normally occur at lower altitudes than the streber (Z. streber).

Taxonomy
Zingel zingel was first formally described as Perca zingel in 1766 by Linnaeus with the type locality given as the River Danube in Germany. When Hippolyte Cloquet (1787–1840) created the genus Zingel he made this species the type species by absolute tautonymy.

References

	

 
zingel
Freshwater fish of Europe
Fish of Europe
Fish described in 1766
Taxa named by Carl Linnaeus